Sädemeid taevast is the first compilation album by Estonian singer Laura Põldvere. It was released on 22 December, in 2011. It consists of all singles released by Laura Põldvere between 2005 and 2011. A new single, titled 2020 was released in November 2011. The title song, "Sädemeid taevast" was originally released on Laura's second studio album Ultra and served as a third single.

Track listing

Laura Põldvere albums
2011 compilation albums
Estonian-language albums